József Sike (born May 1, 1968, in Eger) is a Hungarian sport shooter. He competed in the 10 meter running target event at the Summer Olympics in 1992, 1996, and 2000.

Olympic results

References

1968 births
Living people
Running target shooters
Hungarian male sport shooters
Shooters at the 1992 Summer Olympics
Shooters at the 1996 Summer Olympics
Shooters at the 2000 Summer Olympics
Olympic shooters of Hungary
Sportspeople from Eger